Lieke van Lexmond (born 6 February 1982) is a Dutch actress and television presenter. She is known for playing the roles of Eva Prins in the television series Goudkust and the role of Charlie Fischer in the soap opera Goede tijden, slechte tijden.

Career 

Between 2002 and 2011 she played the role of Charlie Fischer in the soap opera Goede tijden, slechte tijden. Initially she played this role in 2002 for three months to replace Aukje van Ginneken. Van Lexmond became a member of the cast in 2003. In 2011, she decided to leave the soap opera to focus on other projects.

She presented both seasons of The Ultimate Dance Battle in 2011 and 2012. In 2013 and 2014 she was one of the judges in the television series Everybody Dance Now. In 2013, she also presented the television show So You Think You Can Dance: The Next Generation together with Dennis Weening.

In 2012, she participated in an episode of the game show De Jongens tegen de Meisjes.

In 2014, she played a role in the film Tuscan Wedding. In 2015, she played a role in the film Michiel de Ruyter.

She presented Idols 5 (2016) and Idols 6 (2017) of the Idols television series together with Ruben Nicolai.

In 2019, she became the host for the television show The Voice Senior. In the same year, she also played a role in the film De Brief voor Sinterklaas. In 2020, she played a role in the film Casanova's directed by Jamel Aattache. She also plays a role in the 2022 film Zwanger & Co.

Personal life 

In September 2014 she gave birth to a son. In April 2017 she gave birth to her second son. She married Bas van Veggel in June 2016; the wedding took place in Italy.

Selected filmography

Film 

 2014: Tuscan Wedding
 2015: Michiel de Ruyter
 2019: De Brief voor Sinterklaas
 2020: Casanova's
 2022: Zwanger & Co

Television

Actress 

 1998 – 2001: Goudkust
 2003 – 2012: Goede tijden, slechte tijden
 2016 – 2018: Centraal Medisch Centrum

Host 

 2011 – 2012: The Ultimate Dance Battle
 2013:  The Next Generation
 2016 – 2017: Idols!
 2019 – 2021: The Voice Senior

Judge 

 2013 – 2014: Everybody Dance Now

Contestant 

 2012: De Jongens tegen de Meisjes

References

External links 

 

1982 births
Living people
Dutch film actresses
Dutch television actresses
Dutch soap opera actresses
People from IJsselstein
21st-century Dutch actresses
Dutch television presenters
Dutch women television presenters